The Fifteenth Assembly of Pondicherry succeeded the 14th Assembly of Pondicherry and was constituted after the victory of National Democratic Alliance in the 2021 assembly election that was held on April 6, 2021.

Important members 
 Speaker:
 Embalam R. Selvam from 16 June 2021.
 Deputy Speaker:
 P. Rajavelu from 25 August 2021 to 2. Jun. 2019
 Chief Minister:
 N. Rangasamy since 7 May 2021.
 Leader of opposition:
 	R. Siva since 8 May 2021.

Membership by party 
Members of Puducherry assembly by their political party (As on 28.06.2022) :

Members of 15th Legislative Assembly

See also 
 Government of Puducherry
 List of Chief Ministers of Puducherry
 List of speakers of the Puducherry Legislative Assembly
 List of lieutenant governors of Puducherry
 Puducherry Legislative Assembly
 Pondicherry Representative Assembly
 2021 Puducherry Legislative Assembly election
 2016 Puducherry Legislative Assembly election
 First Assembly of Puducherry

References

Notes 

Puducherry Legislative Assembly
Puducherry
2021 establishments in Puducherry
Puducherry